Ruellia rufipila (syn. Eurychanes rufipila Rizzini) is a plant native of Cerrado vegetation of Brazil.

External links
 List of taxa in the Virtual Herbarium Of The New York Botanical Garden: Ruellia rufipila
  List of taxa in the Embrapa Recursos Genéticos e Biotecnologia: Ruellia rufipila

rufipila
Flora of Brazil